Limestone County is a county in the U.S. state of Texas. As of the 2020 census, its population was 22,146. Its county seat is Groesbeck. The county was created in 1846.

History

Native Americans

Indians friendly to the settlers resided in East Texas  before the Kiowa, Apache and Comanche intruded upon their territory. These tribes hunted, farmed the land, and were adept traders. The Tawakoni branch of Wichita Indians originated north of Texas, but migrated south into east Texas. From 1843 onward, the Tawakoni were part of treaties made by both the Republic of Texas and the United States.  Tawakoni were also sometimes known as Tehuacana.  The Limestone County town of Tehuacana was settled on the former site of a Tehuacana village. The Waco people  were also a branch of the Wichita Indians.

Fort Parker massacre

Arguably the most infamous Indian depredation in Texas took place in Limestone County on May 19, 1836, when an odd alliance of Comanche, Kiowa, Caddo, and Wichita approached Fort Parker surreptitiously under a flag of peace. The Indians subsequently attacked the fort, killing or kidnapping all but about 18 settlers who escaped to Fort Houston.  Captured in the Fort Parker massacre were Elizabeth Kellogg, Rachel Plummer and her son James Pratt Plummer, John Richard Parker   and his sister Cynthia Ann Parker, who later became mother of Comanche Chief Quanah Parker.

Settlers

Limestone County was part of the Haden Harrison Edwards (800 families) and Robertson's Colony (800 families) empresario grants  made by the Coahuila y Texas  legislature in 1825.  By contracting how many families each grantee could settle, the government sought to have some control over colonization.

Baptist spiritual leader Daniel Parker  and eight other men organized the Pilgrim Predestinarian Regular Baptist Church in Lamotte, Illinois.  The fellowship in its entirety migrated in 1833 to the new frontier of Texas. Among this group of settlers were Silas M. Parker, Moses Herrin, Elisha Anglin, Luther T. M. Plummer, David Faulkenberry, Joshua Hadley, and Samuel Frost. Fort Parker, near the Navasota River in what is now central Limestone County, was the earliest actual settlement in the vicinity. Following on the heels of the original settlers, other communities were established.

County established

On April 11, 1846, Limestone County was formed from Robertson County. On August 18, 1846, the county was organized.  Springfield became the county seat.  The county seat was moved to Groesbeck in 1873 after boundary changes, and the Springfield courthouse had burned down.

Homesteaders became self-sustaining farmers and ranchers, who also hunted wild game.  Support businesses were connected to the repair and maintenance of farm equipment and livestock. The population of 1860 was 4,537. Of these, 3,464 were White, 1,072 were slaves, and one was a free Black female.

Civil War and Reconstruction

Limestone County voted 525–9 in favor of secession from the Union, and sent its men to fight for the Confederate States of America.  Lochlin Johnson Farrar raised the first Confederate company from the county. Reconstruction in the county was so contentious, with racial violence and threats against the government, that on October 9, 1871, Texas Governor Edmund J. Davis declared the county under martial law.

Post-Civil War development

The Houston and Texas Central Railway laid tracks in 1869, terminating near Kosse which was named after the railway's chief engineer Theodore Kosse. The Trinity and Brazos Valley Railway,  laid track in 1903 from Cleburne to Mexia. Several towns were established on these routes.

The Thornton Institute was founded in 1877 by Edward Coke Chambers, and was chartered in 1881 as the Thornton Male and Female Institute. The school provided a type of dormitory for the students, and sent many graduates out to teach in rural Texas. Henry P. Davis acquired the school in 1889, and in 1891 the school was given to the Thornton Independent School District.

Oil and gas were discovered in Mexia between 1913 and 1920, creating jobs and a population boom - from just 3,482 people to 35,000 in 1922. Martial law had to be briefly declared in Mexia. The population began to decline during the Great Depression.  Camp Mexia, a German prisoner of war camp was built during World War II.

The Work Projects Administration and the Civilian Conservation Corps helped ease the county economy during the Great Depression. The Civilian Conservation Corps built Fort Parker State Recreation Area. The WPA erected a number of buildings in the county.

Geography

Major highways
  U.S. Highway 84
  State Highway 7
  State Highway 14
  State Highway 164
  State Highway 171

Adjacent counties
 Navarro County (north)
 Freestone County (northeast)
 Leon County (southeast)
 Robertson County (south)
 Falls County (southwest)
 McLennan County (west)
 Hill County (northwest)

Demographics

Note: the US Census treats Hispanic/Latino as an ethnic category. This table excludes Latinos from the racial categories and assigns them to a separate category. Hispanics/Latinos can be of any race.

As of the census of 2000,  22,051 people, 7,906 households, and 5,652 families resided in the county.  The population density was 24 people per square mile (9/km2).  The 9,725 housing units averaged 11 per square mile (4/km2).  The racial makeup of the county was 70.75% White 19.07% African American, 0.45% Native American, 0.12% Asian, 8.11% from other races, and 1.49% from two or more races.  About 12.97% of the population was Latino of any race.

Of the 7,906 households, 32.00% had children under the age of 18 living with them, 54.00% were married couples living together, 13.50% had a female householder with no husband present, and 28.50% were not families. About 25.60% of all households were made up of individuals, and 13.80% had someone living alone who was 65 years of age or older.  The average household size was 2.55 and the average family size was 3.04.

In the county, the population was distributed as 25.40% under the age of 18, 9.10% from 18 to 24, 26.40% from 25 to 44, 22.70% from 45 to 64, and 16.40% who were 65 years of age or older.  The median age was 37 years. For every 100 females, there were 103.20 males.  For every 100 females age 18 and over, there were 100.80 males.

The median income for a household in the county was $29,366, and for a family was $36,924. Males had a median income of $28,069 versus $18,893 for females. The per capita income for the county was $14,352.  About 14.40% of families and 17.80% of the population were below the poverty line, including 22.90% of those under age 18 and 15.00% of those age 65 or over.

Communities

Cities
 Groesbeck (county seat)
 Mart (mostly in McLennan County)
 Mexia

Towns
 Coolidge
 Kosse
 Tehuacana
 Thornton

Unincorporated communities
 Ben Hur
 Big Hill
 Box Church
 Buffalo Mop
 Forest Glade
 Old Union
 Oletha
 Prairie Hill
 Victoria

Ghost town
 Springfield

Notable residents
 Alfonso Steele (1817–1911) was born in 1817 in Hardin County, Kentucky, and is buried in Mexia.
 Anna Nicole Smith (1967–2007) lived briefly in Mexia.
 Don the Beachcomber (1907–1989) was born Ernest Raymond Beaumont Gantt in Limestone County.
 Bob Wills (1905-1975) was born on a farm in Kosse, in the southern portion of Limestone County.
 Rachel Plummer (1819-1839) captured by Comanches at the age of seventeen, wrote of her twenty-one month ordeal.

Politics

See also

 National Register of Historic Places listings in Limestone County, Texas
 Recorded Texas Historic Landmarks in Limestone County

References

External links
 Limestone County government's website
 

 
1846 establishments in Texas
Populated places established in 1846